James Kilroy may refer to:

James J. Kilroy, American shipyard inspector, supposed creator of Kilroy was here graffito, politician
James Kilroy (politician) (1890–1954), Irish Fianna Fáil politician